Hai Lam can refer to

 Hai Lam (footballer), Norwegian footballer
 Hai (video gamer), American League of Legends player
 Hai Lam (video gamer), a Dutch pro game player who plays legendary